The Suizhou meteorite is a stone meteorite which fell on April 15, 1986, in Dayanpo, 12.5 km to the southeast of Suizhou city, Hubei province, China. 

Right after the fall of this meteorite, a group of scientists from the China University of Geosciences and the Institute of Geochemistry, Chinese Academy of Sciences, conducted a field survey and collection of Suizhou meteorite samples. A total weight of 270 kg of this meteorite was collected. The largest piece, a fragment of 56 kg in weight, is now preserved in the City Museum of Suizhou, and the smallest piece only weighs 20 g.

References

Meteorites found in China
Geological type localities